Néstor Gabriel Lorenzo (born 26 February 1966) is an Argentine football manager and former player who played as a defender. He is the current head coach of the Colombia national team.

Lorenzo played for Argentinos Juniors, A.S. Bari, Swindon Town, Club Atlético San Lorenzo de Almagro, Ferrocarril Oeste and Boca Juniors. Lorenzo also represented Argentina in the 1990 FIFA World Cup in Italy, including the final which the Argentines lost to Germany.

Playing career
After Italia '90 and after an attempt by Brian Clough to sign Lorenzo for Nottingham Forest fell through, Argentine legend Ossie Ardiles signed the defender for Swindon Town on loan and eventually the deal became a permanent switch.

Lorenzo played 27 times for Swindon, scoring two goals: one in his debut at the County Ground against Portsmouth in a 3–0 win, and one away at Watford in a 2–2 draw.

After seeing out his contract, Lorenzo returned to Argentina. He later turned his hand to coaching, and was part of José Pekerman's staff for the Argentina national team.

Career statistics

England

Managerial statistics

External links
 Argentine Primera statistics
Clarin.com

1966 births
Living people
Argentinos Juniors footballers
S.S.C. Bari players
Serie A players
Swindon Town F.C. players
San Lorenzo de Almagro footballers
Ferro Carril Oeste footballers
Boca Juniors footballers
Club Atlético Banfield footballers
Association football defenders
Argentine footballers
Argentine football managers
Footballers from Buenos Aires
1990 FIFA World Cup players
Argentina international footballers
Footballers at the 1988 Summer Olympics
Olympic footballers of Argentina
Argentine Primera División players
Argentine expatriate footballers
Expatriate footballers in Italy
Expatriate footballers in England
Argentine expatriate sportspeople in Italy
Argentine expatriate sportspeople in England
FBC Melgar managers
Argentine expatriate sportspeople in Peru
Argentine expatriate sportspeople in Colombia
Expatriate football managers in Peru
Expatriate football managers in Colombia
Argentine expatriate football managers
Colombia national football team managers